Uladail is a location near Amhuinnsuidhe, on Harris in the Outer Hebrides, Scotland.

It stands over Loch Uladail.

References

Landforms of the Outer Hebrides
Cliffs of Scotland
Harris, Outer Hebrides
Climbing areas of Scotland